Adam Kotzmann (born 8 April 1993) is a Czech alpine skier. He competed in the 2018 Winter Olympics.

References

1993 births
Living people
Alpine skiers at the 2018 Winter Olympics
Czech male alpine skiers
Olympic alpine skiers of the Czech Republic
Competitors at the 2017 Winter Universiade